Michael Patrick Hulbert (born April 14, 1958) is an American professional golfer and sportscaster.

Hulbert was born in Elmira, New York. He grew up in Horseheads, New York, and was a childhood friend and high school golf rival of fellow PGA Tour player Joey Sindelar. Hulbert attended East Tennessee State University in Johnson City, Tennessee; he earned All-American honors as a member of the golf team in 1979 and 1980. He turned pro in 1981 and joined the PGA Tour in 1985.

Hulbert won three times on the PGA Tour; his last two wins came in playoffs. His first win came at the Federal Express St. Jude Classic in 1986 by one stroke over Joey Sindelar. His second victory was at the 1989 B.C. Open in a playoff over Bob Estes. In his third win at the 1991 Anheuser-Busch Golf Classic, he defeated Kenny Knox on the first hole in a playoff. Hulbert's best finishes in major championships were a T-6 at the 1992 U.S. Open, and a T-7 at the 1986 PGA Championship. He has had more than 45 top-10 finishes in his PGA Tour career including more than a half-dozen 2nd or 3rd-place finishes.

Hulbert had a knack for the Plantation Course at the Kapalua International, an event he won in 1991, and finished 2nd to Davis Love III in 1992.

Hulbert caddied for Davis Love III at the AT&T Pebble Beach National Pro-Am and the Northern Trust Open in the early part of 2008 prior to starting play on the Champions Tour. He began playing on the Champions Tour in April 2008. He finished T8 in his debut event, the Outback Steakhouse Pro-Am, and matched it a year later at the Dick's Sporting Goods Open.

In 2002, Hulbert was inducted into the East Tennessee State University Athletic Hall of Fame. Hulbert has had more than 4.7 million dollars in career earnings. He lives in Orlando, Florida with his wife and two sons. He has a brother named John, a club professional who once qualified for the U.S. Open.

Professional wins (6)

PGA Tour wins (3)

PGA Tour playoff record (2–0)

Other wins (3)

*Note: The 1996 JCPenney Classic was shortened to 54 holes due to weather.

Other playoff record (1–1)

Results in major championships

CUT = missed the half-way cut
"T" = tied

Summary

Most consecutive cuts made – 9 (1989 PGA – 1992 PGA)
Longest streak of top-10s – 1 (twice)

See also
1984 PGA Tour Qualifying School graduates
1985 PGA Tour Qualifying School graduates

References

External links

American male golfers
East Tennessee State Buccaneers men's golfers
PGA Tour golfers
PGA Tour Champions golfers
Golf writers and broadcasters
Golfers from New York (state)
Golfers from Orlando, Florida
Sportspeople from Elmira, New York
1958 births
Living people